Ižipovce is a village and municipality in Liptovský Mikuláš District in the Žilina Region of northern Slovakia.

History
In historical records the village was first mentioned in 1286.

Geography
The municipality lies at an altitude of 605 metres and covers an area of 2.636 km². It has a population of about 83 people.

Genealogical resources

The records for genealogical research are available at the state archive "Statny Archiv in Bytca, Slovakia"

 Lutheran church records (births/marriages/deaths): 1783-1924 (parish B)

See also
 List of municipalities and towns in Slovakia

External links
https://web.archive.org/web/20071027094149/http://www.statistics.sk/mosmis/eng/run.html
Surnames of living people in Izipovce

Villages and municipalities in Liptovský Mikuláš District